Sutton Green can refer to any of the following:
Sutton Green, Surrey, between Guildford and Woking
Sutton Green, London, at the north end of Sutton High Street